= Mersacidin decarboxylase =

mersacidin decarboxylase
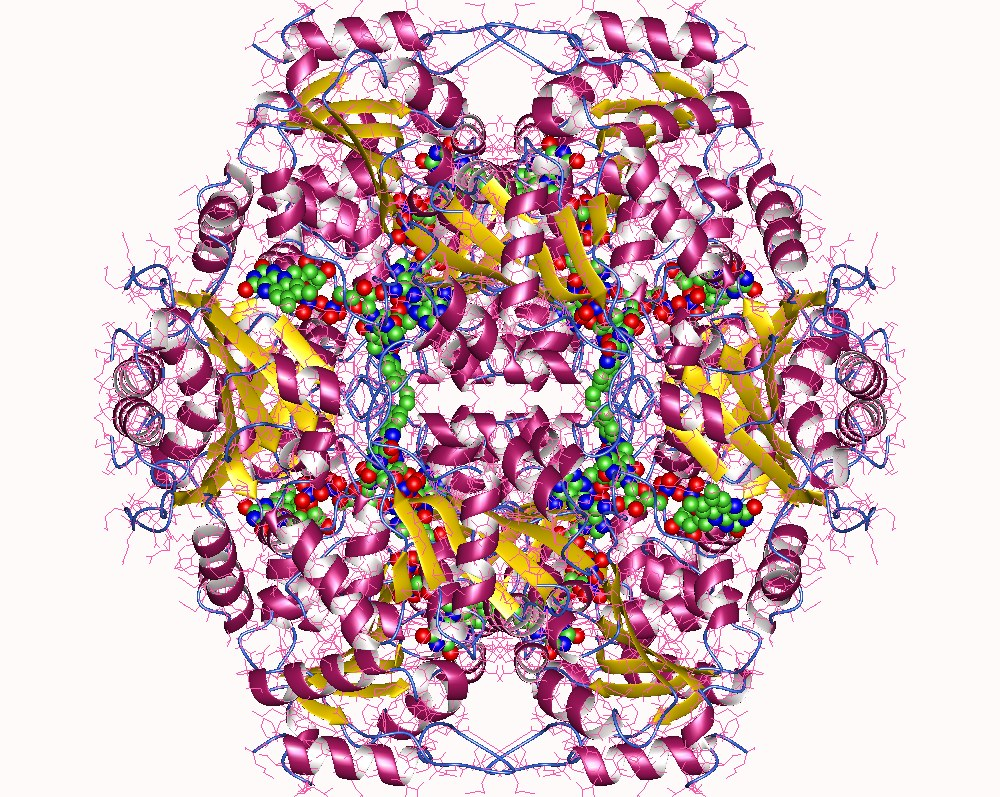
- Mersacidin decarboxylase homododekamer, Bacillus sp.

Identifiers
- EC no.: 4.1.1..

Databases
- IntEnz: IntEnz view
- BRENDA: BRENDA entry
- ExPASy: NiceZyme view
- KEGG: KEGG entry
- MetaCyc: metabolic pathway
- PRIAM: profile
- PDB structures: RCSB PDB PDBe PDBsum
Search
- PMC: articles
- PubMed: articles
- NCBI: proteins

Mersacidin decarboxylase EC 4.1.1.. MrsD is an enzyme that catalyzes the oxidative decarboxylation of the C-terminal cysteine residue of mersacidin to an aminoenethiol residue, intermediate as the first step in the formation of the unusual amino acid S-[(Z)-2-aminovinyl]-methyl-D-cysteine with coenzyme FAD
